Igrexa de Santa María de Cambre is a monastery in Galicia, Spain.

Monasteries in Galicia (Spain)
Churches in Galicia (Spain)
Bien de Interés Cultural landmarks in the Province of A Coruña